Hjalmar Kelin (28 September 1900 – 21 July 1997) was a Finnish footballer. He played in 42 matches for the Finland national football team from 1920 to 1928.

References

External links
 

1900 births
1997 deaths
Finnish footballers
Finland international footballers
Place of birth missing
Association footballers not categorized by position
20th-century Finnish people